is a multi-purpose stadium in Toyama, Japan.  It is currently used mostly for football matches and athletics events. This stadium's capacity is 25,251 people.

External links 
J. League stadium guide 

Athletics (track and field) venues in Japan
Football venues in Japan
Multi-purpose stadiums in Japan
Sports venues in Toyama Prefecture
Kataller Toyama
Sports venues completed in 1993
1993 establishments in Japan
Toyama (city)